Pixley Falls State Park is a  New York state park in the town of Boonville in Oneida County, New York, United States.

Facilities
Open all year, the park gets its name from Pixley Falls, a  waterfall accessible via a short hiking trail. It offers picnicking, a nature trail, hiking, fishing, seasonal hunting, and cross country skiing. It has steep wooded hills, a mountain trout stream, and a trail that runs along the ruins of the 19th-century Black River Canal.

Camping, once permitted at the park, has not been allowed since it became day-use only in 2010.

See also
 List of New York state parks

References

External links
New York State Parks - Pixley Falls State Park
Pixley Falls State Park map

State parks of New York (state)
Parks in Oneida County, New York
Waterfalls of New York (state)